Anteremanthus is a genus of flowering plants belonging to the family Asteraceae.

Its native range is Eastern Brazil.

Species:

Anteremanthus hatschbachii 
Anteremanthus piranii

References

Asteraceae
Asteraceae genera